Gemünden may refer to several places in Germany:

Gemünden am Main, a town in Bavaria
Gemünden (Wohra), a town in Hesse
Gemünden (Felda), a municipality in Hesse  
Gemünden, Rhein-Hunsrück, a municipality in Rhineland-Palatinate  
Gemünden, Westerwaldkreis, a municipality in Rhineland-Palatinate